Cholewa is a Polish coat of arms. It was used by several szlachta families in the times of the Polish–Lithuanian Commonwealth.

History

Blazon

Notable bearers
Notable bearers of this coat of arms include:
Jan Nepomucen Umiński

See also
 Polish heraldry
 Heraldic family
 List of Polish nobility coats of arms

External links
  
  
 https://web.archive.org/web/20150103222016/http://genealogia.grocholski.pl/
 http://www.genealogia.okiem.pl/glossary/glossary.php?definition=Cholewa

Polish coats of arms